Around the Horn is the third album by the Chicago-based band Souled American. It was released in 1990 by Rough Trade Records. The band supported the album by touring with Camper Van Beethoven.

The album was re-released, as part of the Framed box set, by tUMULt Records in 1999.

Production
The band recorded the album quickly, as they thought that Rough Trade may close. The album title refers to the band's desire to use guitars to reproduce the feel of marching band horn lines. "I Keep Holding Back the Tears" was written by bassist Joe Adducci's mother. "Durante's Hornpipe" is a version of the traditional instrumental.

Critical reception

The Chicago Tribune wrote that "Souled American's music seems to spring from familiar folk, country and old-time acoustic blues roots, but the forms are odd and warped, slow and quavery." The Washington Post advised: "Imagine hearing a recording of Neil Young's whiny tenor playing at the wrong speed, revolving at the dreariest pace, accompanied by amateurish guitars, an occasional trombone and muted bass and drums." Entertainment Weekly stated that Souled American's music "is irresistibly deadpan, sounding not at all inept, but simply homemade... Maybe they're telling us that traditional country life has now declined into something threadbare and dim."

According to AllMusic: "Around the Horn shows the band now fully master of a unique kind of Americana, here much more melancholy and gently downbeat than ever before, guitars more apt to ring softly or solitarily than anything else. The dub and r'n'b touches prevalent on the first two albums aren't as apparent here, but what the band loses in relative breadth it more than makes up for in atmosphere."

Track listing
 "Around the Horn" – 3:43
 "Second of All" – 4:01
 "Old, Old House" – 3:31
 "Durante's Hornpipe" – 2:02
 "Rise Above It" – 6:10
 "Six Feet of Snow" – 4:18
 "Willdawg" – 3:23
 "I Keep Holding Back the Tears" – 4:26
 "You" – 4:11
 "Luggy Di" – 2:39
 "In the Mud" – 2:19

All songs by Souled American except "Old, Old House" by George Jones, "Six Feet of Snow" by Little Feat, "Durante's Hornpipe" (traditional), and "I Keep Holding Back the Tears" by bassist Joe Adducci's mother.

Personnel
 Joe Adducci – bass, vocals
 Jamey Barnard – drums
 Chris Grigoroff – guitar, vocals
 Scott Tuma – guitar
 Jaimo (Jaimo Ferrone) - trombone on "Second of All"

References

The Nation: Album review by Gene Santoro, May 1990.

Souled American albums
1990 albums
Rough Trade Records albums